Ajith Amerasekera from the Texas Instruments Inc., in Dallas, TX was named Fellow of the Institute of Electrical and Electronics Engineers (IEEE) in 2012 for leadership in semiconductor innovation and contributions to circuit design.

Amerasekera was Chief Technical Officer for TI's ASIC Business Unit.
His Ph.D. is in Electrical Engineering and Physics.

References 

Fellow Members of the IEEE
Living people
American chief technology officers
Year of birth missing (living people)
American electrical engineers